Nikolaev Institute of Inorganic Chemistry of the Siberian Branch of the RAS is a research institute in Akademgorodok of Novosibirsk, Russia. It was founded in 1957.

Activities
Chemistry of inorganic compounds, chemical thermodynamics of inorganic systems, crystal chemistry and electronic structure of inorganic substances etc.

References

Research institutes in Novosibirsk
1957 establishments in the Soviet Union
Research institutes established in 1957
Inorganic chemistry
Research institutes in the Soviet Union
Chemical research institutes